An orbital stretch wrapper is a means of applying stretchable plastic film to a load, consisting of a roll (or rolls) of stretch wrap supported on a vertical rotating ring and a means of passing a load through the ring's eye horizontally.  Several designs are available.

The item or load can go through the ring  on a conveyor or can be placed into the ring by a pallet truck.  Small loads can be suspended within the rotating ring by hand.  Stretch is achieved by creating tension between the load and film roll using a brake or gear ratio system.

References

Books
 Yam, K. L., "Encyclopedia of Packaging Technology", John Wiley & Sons, 2009, 

Packaging machinery